Labeobarbus megastoma is a species of ray-finned fish in the genus Labeobarbus which is endemic to Lake Tana in Ethiopia.

References 

Endemic fauna of Ethiopia
megastoma
Fish described in 1997
Fish of Lake Tana